Henry Seymour Guinness (1858–1945) was an Irish engineer, banker and politician.

Henry Guinness may also refer to:

Henry Eustace Guinness (1897–1972), Irish banker and politician, member of the 8th Seanad Éireann
Henry Grattan Guinness (1835–1910), Irish Protestant Christian preacher and author

See also
Guinness family